Holmen or Holmén is a Nordic surname that may refer to:

Dag Holmen-Jensen (born 1954), Norwegian ski jumper
Janne Holmén (born 1977), Finnish long-distance runner
Jonas Holmen (1868–1953), Norwegian Nordic skier
Kim Holmen (born 1982), Norwegian football striker
Kjersti Holmen (1956–2021), Norwegian actress
Nina Holmén (born 1951), Finnish long-distance runner, mother of Janne
Rasmus Holmen (born 1993), Swedish ice hockey player
Samuel Holmén (born 1984), Swedish football player
Sebastian Holmén (born 1992), Swedish football player
Stefan Holmén (born 1967), Swedish curler
Tobias Holmen Johansen (born 1990), Norwegian football player
Unni Holmen (born 1952), Norwegian Olympic gymnast